Paul J. Zak (born 9 February 1962) is an American neuroeconomist.

Background
Zak graduated with degrees in mathematics and economics from San Diego State University before acquiring a PhD in Economics from the University of Pennsylvania. He is professor at Claremont Graduate University in Southern California. He has studied brain imaging, and was among the first to identify the role of oxytocin in mediating trusting behaviors between unacquainted humans. Zak directs the Center for Neuroeconomics Studies at Claremont Graduate University and is a member of the Neurology Department at Loma Linda University Medical Center. He edited Moral Markets: The Critical Role of Values in the Economy (Princeton University Press, 2008). His book, The Moral Molecule was published in 2012 by Dutton.  The book summarizes his findings on oxytocin and discusses the role of oxytocin in human experiences and behaviors such as empathy, altruism, and morality.

Zak's research aims to challenge the thought that people generally are driven primarily to act for what they consider their self-interest, and asks how morality may modulate one's interpretation of what constitutes "self-interest" in one's own personal terms. Methodological questions have arisen in regards to Zak's work, however.  Other commentators though have called his work "one of the most revealing experiments in the history of economics."
According to The Moral Molecule, Zak's father was an engineer and he takes an engineering approach to neuroscience, seeking to create predictive models of behavior.

His research and ideas have garnered some criticism, particularly from science writer Ed Yong, who points out that oxytocin administration boosts schadenfreude and envy. Oxytocin administration increases the salience of social cues, suggesting that priming effects in these experiments explain their findings. For example, Zak has shown that endogenous oxytocin release eliminates in-group bias indicating that the critiqued effects are due to supraphysiologic doses of oxytocin coupled with antisocial priming.  

Neuroscientist Molly Crockett also disputes Zak's claims, referring to studies that show oxytocin increases gloating, bias at the expense of other groups, and in some cases decreasing cooperation; suggesting oxytocin is as much an "immoral molecule" as 'the moral molecule' Paul Zak claims.

Neuromanagement
Zak has coined the term "neuromanagement" to describe how findings in neuroscience can be used to create organizational cultures that are highly engaging for employees and produce high performance for organizations.  He has developed a methodology called Ofactor that quantifies organizational culture and identifies how to continuously improve culture to increase trust, joy, and performance.  He has used Ofactor to help organizations ranging from nonprofits to startups to Fortune 50 companies change their cultures. His Ofactor research reflects the approach advocated by his late colleague at Claremont Graduate University, management guru Peter F. Drucker, in which organizations with flat hierarchies empower employees.  His 2017 book Trust Factor: The Science of Creating High-Performance Companies shows leaders of organizations how to create and sustain a culture of trust.

Scholarly impact
Zak has published more than 200 peer-reviewed papers, book chapters, and commentaries. He was listed by researchers at Stanford University as being in the world's top 0.3% of the most cited scientists.

Immersion and consumer neuroscience
Zak's lab has discovered neurologic signals that reflect engagement in stories and predict post-narrative behaviors.  Some of this work was funded by DARPA to help the U.S. military reduce conflict.

Media
Zak is frequently interviewed in the media on topics ranging from economic policy to romantic relationships. His 2011 TED talk on oxytocin and trust has gained over a million views.  He was named by Wired magazine as one of the 10 Sexiest Geeks in 2005.   Zak suggests that intimate contact, using social ritual and social media such as using Twitter and Facebook raises oxytocin levels.  He is a frequent public speaker on the neuroscience of daily life, including morality, storytelling, and organizational culture and writes articles for magazines and trade publication on these topics.

Zak is a member of the Screen Actors Guild and has created and voiced science dialog for movies, including The Amazing Spiderman.  He is a regular panelist on the Discovery Science program Outrageous Acts of Psych.  News organizations often request his expertise on neuroscience. In 2016, he was featured on The Bachelor as Dr. Love on one of the main characters' dates. His other TV appearances include Fareed Zakaria's GPS on CNN, the John Stossel show on Fox Business, the Dr. Phil show, TakePart Live on Pivot TV, Fox and Friends, Good Morning America, The Bachelorette, and ABC World News Tonight.

Publications

Books

Journal articles

Multimedia
 TED Talk The Moral Molecule
 TEDx Amsterdam Talk The Science of Good and Evil
 TEDx Amsterdam Women Talk Biological Differences Between Men and Women

References

External links
 Paul J. Zak website
 Center for Neuroeconomics Studies
ScriptsandScribes.com Interview with Paul Zak

1962 births
Living people
Economists from California
Neuroeconomists
American neuroscientists
Claremont Graduate University faculty
Massachusetts General Hospital fellows
San Diego State University alumni
University of Pennsylvania School of Arts and Sciences alumni
21st-century American economists